John Moran (9 February 1906 – 12 October 1959) was an English professional footballer who played for Earlestown, Wigan Borough, Tottenham Hotspur, Watford and Mansfield Town.

Football career 
Born in Wigan, Moran joined Wigan Borough after playing for non League Earlestown. Between 1925–30 the outside left played 201 matches for the Lancashire club. In 1931 he signed for Tottenham Hotspur where he featured in a further 12 matches   before joining Watford in September, 1932 for a fee of £150. He went on to make 100 appearances for the Hertfordshire club. Moran signed for Mansfield Town in 1935 and played in 30 games before ending his playing career.

Moran died in Newton-le-Willows at the age of 53.

References 

1906 births
1959 deaths
English footballers
Footballers from Wigan
English Football League players
Wigan Borough F.C. players
Tottenham Hotspur F.C. players
Watford F.C. players
Mansfield Town F.C. players
Association football outside forwards